Cantamessa is an Italian surname. Notable people with the surname include:

 Christian Cantamessa (born 1976), Italian-American video game design
 Gene Cantamessa (1931–2011), American sound engineer
Jim Cantamessa (born 1978), American basketball player and coach
 Steve Cantamessa, American sound engineer

Italian-language surnames